Matuschka (German-language spelling), Matuška (Czech language spelling), Matúška (Slovak language spelling), or Matuska (Hungarian-language spelling) is a surname of Austrian nobility of Slavic language origin.

The surname may refer to:

Michael Graf von Matuschka (1888-1944), German politician
Szilveszter Matuska (1892-1945), Hungarian mass murderer and mechanical engineer who derailed trains
Hartmut von Matuschka, captain of German submarine U-482
Janko Matúška (1821-1877), Slovak poet, activist, and playwright
Waldemar Matuška, Czechoslovak singer

See also
Matuschka (birth name: Joanne Motichka) a New York City photographer, artist, author, activist, and model

Czech-language surnames
German-language surnames
Hungarian-language surnames

sc:Matuška